Ernest, Duke of Saxe-Hildburghausen (12 June 1655 in Gotha – 17 October 1715 in Hildburghausen) was a duke of Saxe-Hildburghausen.

He was the ninth but sixth surviving son of Ernest I, Duke of Saxe-Gotha and Elisabeth Sophie of Saxe-Altenburg.

When his father died in 1675, Ernest and his six brothers jointly assumed the government of the duchy; five years later, in 1680, and under the treaty of division of the family lands, he received the towns of Hildburghausen, Eisfeld, Heldburg, Königsberg. Ernest became thereby founder and first duke of Saxe-Hildburghausen. After the death of his brothers Heinrich and Albrecht without male descendants, he took the towns of Sonnefeld and Behringen.

Ernest settled his official residence in Hildburghausen and began the building of his castle. In 1710 he approved the building in his lands of a new city of French Huguenot families, who were driven out after the Edict of Nantes from France.

As Master of Cavalry he fought in 1683 in the Battle of Vienna, and 1685 in the conquest of Gran and Neuhaeusel, after this he entered the Dutch States Army as a Colonel with the conquest of Kaiserswerth.

In the building of his new residence, Ernest acquired a serious indebtedness of the principality to his brothers, which could not be reduced even by ever larger taxations.

Issue
He was married in Arolsen on the 30 November 1680 to Sophie of Waldeck. They had five children:
 Ernest Frederick I, Duke of Saxe-Hildburghausen (b. Gotha, 21 August 1681 – d. Hildburghausen, 9 March 1724).
 Sophie Charlotte (b. Arolsen, 23 December 1682 – d. Eisfeld, 20 April 1684).
 Sophie Charlotte (b. Hildburghausen, 23 March 1685 – d. Hildburghausen, 4 June 1710).
 Karl Wilhelm (b. Arolsen, 25 July 1686 – d. Arolsen, 2 April 1687).
 Joseph Maria Frederick Wilhelm (b. Erbach, 5 October 1702 – d. Hildburghausen, 4 January 1787).

Ancestry

References
Rudolf Armin Human, Chronik der Stadt Hildburghausen, Hildburghausen, 1886
Heinrich Ferdinand Schoeppl, Die Herzoge von Sachsen-Altenburg, Bozen, 1917, Neudruck Altenburg, 1992.
Johann Samuel Ersch, Allgemeine Encyclopädie der Wissenschaften und Künste, p. 300. (Digitalisat)

1655 births
1715 deaths
House of Saxe-Hildburghausen
Dukes of Saxe-Hildburghausen
People from Gotha (town)